Michael Ortiz (born August 6, 1954) is a dual American-Spanish scientist and researcher in the fields of structural, continuum and computational mechanics and is a Frank and Ora Lee Marble Professor Emeritus of Aeronautics and Mechanical Engineering at California Institute of Technology. Prior to his arrival at Caltech in 1995, he was Professor of Engineering at Brown University.

Since 2020 he is a Professor Emeritus in the Engineering and Applied Science Division at Caltech, also holding positions as Research Chair in the Institute of Applied Mathematics, University of Bonn and as Adjunct Professor and Timoshenko Distinguished Fellow in the departments of Mechanical Engineering and Aeronautics and Astronautics of Stanford University.

Background

Education 
 (BS), Polytechnic University of Madrid,1977, 
 (MS), University of California, Berkeley, 1978, 
 (PhD), University of California, Berkeley, 1982. Dissertation: "Constitutive Theory for Inelastic Solids". Thesis advisor: Egor P. Popov.

Awards 

 Rodney Hill Prize, International Union of Theoretical and Applied Mechanics (IUTAM) 2008.
 Timoshenko Medal, American Society of Mechanical Engineers (ASME), 2015.
 Doctor Honoris Causa, Universidad Politecnica de Madrid, Spain, 2019.
 John von Neumann Medal, US Association for Computational Mechanics (USACM), 2019.

Academy Membership 

 2013 Elected Member of the U.S. National Academy of Engineering (NAE).
 2007 Elected Fellow of the American Academy of Arts & Sciences (AAAS).
 1999 Corresponding Member, Spanish Academy of Engineering.

References 

1954 births
Living people